Katakel is an arrondissement of Kaffrine in Kaffrine Region in Senegal.

References 

Arrondissements of Senegal